Khanpur (Urdu: خانپور) is small city and the Tehsil/Talka of the District Shikarpur in province Sindh of Pakistan. Furthermore, this tehsil has kacha (desert area) land with Indus River, oil and gas fields, PARCO pumping station, rice and flour mills.
Historically, Khanpur Tehsil was highly influenced by Sayeds considered as a holy caste in the village. Sayed Dara Shah who migrated from west of Samarkand Bukhara, Uzbekistan carried out Islamic activities in the region. He not just taught message of Islam to masses but also brought peace and harmony in Khanpur. 

Populated places in Shikarpur District
Tehsils of Sindh